The following fictional characters are staff members and denizens of Hogwarts in the Harry Potter books written by J. K. Rowling.

The staff and their positions

Teachers and staff members
The following teachers and staff members do not have their own articles or are not listed in other articles.

Argus Filch

Argus Filch is the caretaker of Hogwarts. While he is not an evil character, he is ill-tempered, which makes him unpopular with the student body, and occasionally causes tension or exasperation with teachers and other staff. His knowledge of the secrets and short-cuts of the castle is almost unparalleled, except perhaps by the users of the Marauder's Map (the Weasley twins, Harry, Ron and Hermione), and Voldemort himself. He tends to favour almost sadistically harsh punishments, and gleefully allies himself with Umbridge when she prescribes such punishments on students. He has an obsessive dislike of mud, animate toys, and all other things that might interfere with his desire for an immaculately clean and orderly Hogwarts. He is also portrayed as having a constant antagonism towards Peeves the poltergeist and often tells Dumbledore that Peeves should be thrown out of Hogwarts. He also likes to wander Hogwarts' corridors at night, presumably in the hope of catching a student out of bed.

Filch is revealed to be a Squib in Harry Potter and the Chamber of Secrets when Harry accidentally discovers that he is trying to teach himself basic magic from a Kwikspell correspondence course. Nonetheless, Filch is at least able to use wizarding devices that have their own innate magic, such as the Secrecy Sensor used in Harry Potter and the Half-Blood Prince. It is hinted that his dislike of students may stem from his disappointment and jealousy at not being able to do magic.  In Harry Potter and the Deathly Hallows, the final book, when the school starts preparing itself for the Battle of Hogwarts, Filch is seen yelling that students are out of bed. He is later seen overseeing the evacuation of younger students.

Filch has a cat named Mrs Norris to whom he has a particular and possessive attachment. She acts as a hallway monitor or spy for Filch. If she observes students engaging in suspicious activity or out of bed after curfew, she finds Filch and he arrives in seconds. She has been known to follow Hagrid everywhere he goes in the school, apparently under Filch's orders. According to J.K. Rowling, there is nothing particularly magical about Mrs Norris, other than her being "just an intelligent (and unpleasant) cat." It's the ambition of many Hogwarts students to "give her a good kick". In the Chamber of Secrets incident, Mrs Norris is temporarily petrified by the Basilisk, which causes Filch extreme distress.

David Bradley portrays Filch in the film series. Mrs Norris was played by three Maine Coon cats named Maximus, Alanis, and Cornilusa.

Filius Flitwick
Filius Flitwick is the Charms Master at Hogwarts and the head of Ravenclaw house. He is a very short, dwarf-like man. In Harry Potter and the Philosopher's Stone he uses his magical skills to help decorate the Great Hall for Christmas. He is also one of the teachers who cast spells to guard the Philosopher's Stone by putting charms on a hundred keys so they can fly, making it difficult to find the key to the door leading to the next chamber.

During Harry's second year, Flitwick helps Professor Sinistra carry a petrified Justin Finch-Fletchley to the hospital wing. He teaches the front doors to recognise a picture of Sirius after his second break-in in Harry Potter and the Prisoner of Azkaban, and to instantly lock down if he tries to break in. He helps patrol the perimeter of the maze for the third task of the Triwizard Tournament held in Harry's fourth year. He eventually removes most of the swamp that is created within the school by Fred and George in Harry Potter and the Order of the Phoenix, though he previously leaves the swamp untouched to annoy Umbridge. He does however choose to leave a small patch of it behind, because he thinks it is "a good bit of magic" and a tribute to the Weasley twins. Near the end of Half-Blood Prince, Flitwick is sent by Professor McGonagall to ask Professor Snape to come to the aid of the Order of the Phoenix against the intruding Death Eaters. He collapses after requesting Snape's help at the battle.

In Harry Potter and the Deathly Hallows, Flitwick insists that Rowena Ravenclaw's Diadem is lost, and he is described by Harry (along with Dumbledore) as having been a "model student" who supposedly never entered the Room of Hidden Things, and so it never occurred to him that the diadem could be hidden there. Before the Battle of Hogwarts, Flitwick helps to chase Severus Snape out of the Hogwarts castle alongside professors McGonagall and Sprout, and to put protective charms around the castle to hinder Voldemort and his oncoming Death Eaters, and later fights the intruders in the battle, battling Corban Yaxley and later defeating Antonin Dolohov.

In the film adaptations, Flitwick is portrayed by Warwick Davis. Rowling said: "I must admit, I was taken aback when I saw the film Flitwick, who looks very much like a goblin/elf (I’ve never actually asked the film-makers precisely what he is), because the Flitwick in my imagination simply looks like a very small old man." Rowling mentions on her official website that Flitwick is human, with "a dash of goblin ancestry." His on-screen appearance changes noticeably in Harry Potter and the Prisoner of Azkaban, in which he takes on a more human and less elf-like look, with slicked-down dark hair and moustache. According to Davis, the moustachioed character was originally not supposed to be Flitwick; Flitwick was absent from the script for Harry Potter and the Prisoner of Azkaban, but "the producer" (presumably David Heyman) added the new character (as the conductor of the school choir and orchestra, credited as "Choir Master") so that Davis could still appear in the film. Goblet of Fire director Mike Newell preferred the new look, "and from that moment, the character became known as 'Flitwick'." Flitwick was born on 17 October.

Gilderoy Lockhart
Gilderoy Lockhart is a popular author and wizarding celebrity who has written many books about his adventures encountering dark creatures and serves as the Defence Against the Dark Arts instructor for Chamber of Secrets. He is unpopular with most of the staff, particularly Snape, for his endless self-promotion and penchant for publicity stunts. He is greatly admired by many others, particularly women (including Hermione and Molly Weasley) due to his intense charisma. Harry dislikes Lockhart for a number of reasons: his arrogance, his belief that Harry flew to Hogwarts in Mr. Weasley's car to seek further attention, his constantly forcing Harry to partake in his antics, and the trouble he has with simple magic such as healing Harry's broken arm (he accidentally vanishes Harry's arm bones instead). Lockhart is exposed as a charlatan and a coward when he attempts to avoid entering the Chamber of Secrets by revealing to Harry and Ron that he never performed the amazing feats documented in his books; he simply passed off the feats of other wizards and witches as his own and erased their memories to hide the truth. He attempts to do the same to Harry and Ron, but Harry disarms him. Lockhart then steals Ron's damaged wand, but the Memory Charm he casts backfires and leaves him with permanent amnesia; arrangements are made for him to be institutionalized until his memory can be fixed.  

In Order of the Phoenix, Harry comes across Lockhart in St Mungo's while visiting Arthur Weasley at Christmas. Lockhart has not recovered any of his memories but is childishly proud of being able to write in "joined-up letters". He still enjoys signing autographs and continues to receive fan mail, although he has no idea why. For his part, Harry feels a slight twinge of guilt for Lockhart's amnesia (especially since it becomes clear that St. Mungo's has given up on trying to undo the damage) but he consoles himself with the fact that it was Lockhart's own fault that he is now reduced to a child-like mentality. 

Rowling has said Lockhart is the only character she has ever based on a real-life person. Lockhart was inspired by an unrevealed acquaintance who was "even more objectionable than his fictional counterpart" and "used to tell whopping great fibs about his past life, all of them designed to demonstrate what a wonderful, brave and brilliant person he was."

Kenneth Branagh portrayed Lockhart in the film version of Chamber of Secrets. In an end-credits scene, his latest book is on sale in Diagon Alley; titled Who Am I?, it displays a picture of him humming distractedly to himself and wearing a straitjacket.

Poppy Pomfrey
Madam Poppy Pomfrey is the sole magical Healer of the Hogwarts hospital wing. She is loyal, highly skilled, non-inquisitive and tight-lipped about her patients, and very strict regarding the rules of her infirmary.

Harry ends up under her care rather often. In Philosopher's Stone, he spends three days unconscious in the hospital wing after the confrontation with Professor Quirrell. In Chamber of Secrets, he spends one painful night regrowing bones in his arm, after Gilderoy Lockhart vanishes them, much to Pomfrey's vexation. In Prisoner of Azkaban, she tends to Harry twice; once after the Quidditch match against Hufflepuff and once after the Shrieking Shack incident. She speaks approvingly of Lupin's prescription of chocolate to alleviate the effects of a dementor's presence on students, commenting that Hogwarts has "finally got a Defence Against the Dark Arts teacher who knows his remedies". In Goblet of Fire, she treats Harry twice; once for a dragon strike and once after the confrontation with Voldemort. In Half-Blood Prince, she tends to Harry after his skull is cracked by a Bludger in a Quidditch match.

Others who end up under her care expose more of her personality. In Chamber of Secrets, Hermione ends up in the hospital wing for a month after a mishap with the Polyjuice Potion leaves her half-feline. Pomfrey is careful to keep this a secret. In Order of the Phoenix, after Umbridge's henchmen stun McGonagall, Madam Pomfrey says she would resign in protest were she not afraid of what would become of the students without her presence. In Half-Blood Prince, she attempts to heal Bill of his scars from Greyback's attack without much success, and bursts into tears when she hears of Dumbledore's death. In Deathly Hallows, she and Filch oversee the evacuation of Hogwarts before the battle. She is later seen tending to the injured fighters.

Gemma Jones appeared as Madam Pomfrey in the film adaptations of Chamber of Secrets, Half Blood Prince, and Deathly Hallows – Part 2.

Quirinus Quirrell
Quirinus Quirrell is the Defence Against the Dark Arts teacher at Hogwarts during Harry's first year and secretly a follower of Voldemort. Before his employment at Hogwarts, he is said by Hagrid to have had a "brilliant mind" and been a skilled teacher; some time before Harry's arrival at Hogwarts, "he took a year off to get some first-hand experience" after learning mostly from books. Rowling stated in a live web chat on 30 July 2007 that Quirrell had worked at Hogwarts as professor of Muggle Studies for a certain length of time, before taking the cursed Defence Against the Dark Arts position in the same year that Harry joined. There were rumours that he encountered vampires in the Black Forest and one in Romania, and he apparently had "a nasty bit of trouble with a hag". After that, he was 'never the same' – upon his return, he appears perpetually nervous and has developed a stutter and nervous tics and Hagrid was able to say even before the beginning of the autumn term that he was "scared of the students, scared of his own subject". Quirrell's attire includes a new purple turban which he claims to have received as a reward from an African prince for getting rid of a troublesome zombie. Fred and George constantly joke that the turban was full of garlic to ward away vampires and in one part they even enchant snowballs to hit it.

Harry first meets Quirrell at the Leaky Cauldron, while being escorted by Hagrid to Diagon Alley to shop for school supplies. Quirrell is next seen at Hogwarts conversing with Snape at the start-of-term banquet, and then regularly while teaching Defence Against the Dark Arts lessons. During the school's Halloween banquet, Quirrell appears in the Great Hall to warn staff and students of a troll in the dungeons and then he faints, so he can freely make his way to the third-floor corridor where the Stone is hidden. Snape who, apparently, already suspected Quirrell was up to something, goes to the third floor in order to stop him.  In later novels, the readers learn that Dumbledore had told Snape to keep an eye on the Defence Against the Dark Arts professor. Quirrell is unable to get to the Stone, but in the process, Snape is bitten by Fluffy.  When Harry and his friends see that Snape has been bitten, they begin to suspect Snape is after the Stone for himself.  While playing Quidditch, Harry is almost thrown off his broom by some sort of curse and he, Ron, and Hermione believe it is Snape who is responsible. They begin to suspect that Snape is trying to steal the Stone hidden in a secret chamber in Hogwarts; when Harry finally arrives in the chamber, he discovers that it is not Snape, but Quirrell who is the real villain.

During his European travels, Quirrell discovered the barely alive Voldemort, who had been in hiding since his failed bid to kill Harry as an infant. Quirrell became attracted to Voldemort's offers of power and returned to Britain with the Dark Lord. Quirrell addresses and refers to Voldemort by that name, rather than "The Dark Lord" as other Death Eaters do. Initially, Voldemort allowed Quirrell to act autonomously – Quirrell was able to shake hands with Harry in the Leaky Cauldron, and was not wearing the turban, meaning that Voldemort was not possessing him (though this changes in the film version, where Quirrell wears the turban at the Leaky Cauldron and refuses to shake Harry's hand). Voldemort first used Quirrell in a plan to steal the Philosopher's Stone from its vault in Gringotts Bank, where it had been deposited for safekeeping by Dumbledore. But Dumbledore had already sent Hagrid on a mission to retrieve the Stone, which he did while he and Harry were shopping in Diagon Alley, after they met with Quirrell in the Leaky Cauldron.

Voldemort, as punishment for Quirrell's failure to secure the Stone from Gringotts, decided to keep a closer watch on his new servant.  He took possession of Quirrell's body, which caused his face to appear on the back of Quirrell's bald head. To conceal this, Quirrell took to wearing the turban. To keep Voldemort alive, Quirrell had to kill unicorns in the Forbidden Forest, drinking their blood to provide temporary life-sustaining powers for Voldemort. Quirrell then reveals that he was the one who let in the troll and attempted to throw Harry off his broom while Snape muttered a counter curse. He also admits that his stutter was faked so he would appear harmless and thus avoid suspicion.

During the climax of the story, as Harry and Quirrell try to recover the Stone from the Mirror of Erised, Voldemort reveals himself on the back of Quirrell's head, formerly concealed by the turban, and speaks directly to Harry, threatening to kill him if he does not assist Voldemort in recovering it. After Harry refuses, Quirrell tries to take the Stone by force. Voldemort orders Quirrell to use a killing curse on Harry, who holds off Quirrell long enough for Dumbledore to arrive, at which point Voldemort flees in his non-physical form. Voldemort's departure, as well as the agony suffered by him because of his contact with Harry, who continues to be protected by the love of his mother and the spell that was cast by her sacrificing her life, causes Quirrell to die, hence Dumbledore's comment that Voldemort is as merciless to his followers as to his enemies.

Before he dies, Quirrell tells Harry of the rivalry between his father, the late James Potter, and Snape: "Didn't you know? Snape went to school with your father. They loathed each other."

The film version's climax ends a little differently. Voldemort does not threaten Harry but instead tries to tempt him with a false promise of resurrecting his parents. Harry is not fooled, but when Quirrell attempts to strangle him to death, Harry's blood protection, which was provided by his mother's sacrifice of her own life to save him, enables Harry to kill Quirrell himself. Harry discovers that when he comes into direct contact with Quirrell, it immediately produces a burning effect. Harry puts both his hands on Quirrell, who burns into crumbling ash. The spirit form of Voldemort renders Harry unconscious before making his escape.

Though Quirrell's first name was never mentioned in the novels, the character is given the first name "Quirinus" in the official Harry Potter Trading Card Game. He is also noted for being one of the few characters in the original stories to not use a wand, as he manages to restrain Harry with magical ropes by simply snapping his fingers.

British actor Ian Hart portrayed Quirrell in the film adaptation of the book.

Horace Slughorn
Horace Slughorn is the long-serving Potions teacher and Head of Slytherin House since at least the 1940s, until his retirement after the 1981–82 school year. Following his retirement and the resurgence of Voldemort, Slughorn goes into hiding, concealing all knowledge of his whereabouts from both sides in the growing conflict in the wizarding world. After moving Snape to Defence Against the Dark Arts, Dumbledore locates Slughorn and uses Harry as incentive to convince him to return to teaching Potions. Slughorn is described as preferring to be a "back-seat driver", obtaining things he desires by using his contacts, particularly students whom he has invited into the "Slug Club", a group of students favoured by Slughorn, based either on their connections to important people (a type of cronyism) or on his belief that they have talents that will make them important and famous themselves when they leave school (meritocracy). He is one of the first Slytherin characters to defy the house's stereotype and being portrayed in a somewhat positive light: while he is self-serving and not above bending rules, he lacks the near-amorality and underhandedness that had, until that point, been a hallmark of the house. He does not resent blood status in general, and admits a pleasurable surprise when he comes upon a talented Muggle-born, such as Hermione or, years before, Harry's mother Lily Potter, one of his all-time favourite pupils. Also, Slughorn notably displays not pride, but shame at having helped a young Tom Marvolo Riddle perform some of his most noted and impressive feats of magic, as Riddle had questioned Slughorn about Horcruxes. Students he deems unimportant he ignores, as though they were not there.

In Half-Blood Prince, Harry is invited to the first meeting of the Slug Club held on the Hogwarts Express. Slughorn sets less-stringent entry criteria for Advanced Potions than his predecessor, lowering the required grade from a perfect O (Outstanding) to the above-average E (Exceeds Expectations). This last-minute change enables Harry and Ron to take Potions at NEWT level. Since Harry had not expected to be allowed to join the course, he has none of the necessary materials, and Slughorn lends him an old textbook until Harry can procure his own. Later, Harry does buy a new copy of Advanced Potion-Making from Flourish and Blotts, but switches the covers and gives back the new book. During his first class, Slughorn offers a small amount of Felix Felicis to the student who brews the best cauldron of the Draught of Living Death. Harry wins with the help of handwritten notes in the borrowed textbook, which, unbeknownst to him, had once belonged to Snape. When Ron falls victim to a high-strength love potion, Slughorn administers an antidote, but then nearly kills him with a drink of poisoned mead, not knowing that the bottle had been planted by Draco Malfoy in an attempt to kill Dumbledore. Harry later uses the Felix Felicis to help retrieve a memory from Slughorn that details the conversation between the professor and Riddle about Horcruxes as well as the possibility of creating more than one Horcrux.

In Harry Potter and the Deathly Hallows, Slughorn briefly appears with other teachers assembling to fight Death Eaters. As Snape is now Headmaster, Slughorn has again assumed the post of Head of Slytherin. Though he is initially hesitant to join in the Battle of Hogwarts and is assumed to have evacuated with his house, he returns to the fray later on. It is revealed that he has not fled, but has recruited a large number of reinforcements to fight for Hogwarts. He then summons up the courage to duel Voldemort, alongside McGonagall and Kingsley Shacklebolt.

Slughorn is played by Jim Broadbent in the film adaptations of Harry Potter and the Half-Blood Prince and Harry Potter and the Deathly Hallows – Part 2.

Pomona Sprout
Pomona Sprout is Professor of Herbology and the Head of Hufflepuff House. She is described as a dumpy little witch with flyaway grey hair who wears a patched, frayed hat and shabby robes, often covered in dirt due to the time she spends tending plants in the Hogwarts greenhouses. Sprout is introduced in Philosopher's Stone, but she plays no active role until Chamber of Secrets, in which she teaches her second year students to work with Mandrake plants. She is responsible for raising the Mandrakes to full maturity, at which point their juice is used to revive the petrified victims of the basilisk.

Sprout subsequently appears in Goblet of Fire in which, as the Hufflepuff Head of House, she comforts Amos Diggory and his wife after the death of their son, Hufflepuff student Cedric Diggory, whom she knew well. In Order of the Phoenix, Sprout is a non-vocal supporter of Harry's story about Voldemort's resurrection. Like many teachers at Hogwarts, she detests Umbridge's presence and does her best to disobey her. After the raid of Hogwarts in Half-Blood Prince, Sprout is a staunch advocate of keeping Hogwarts open. She also supports the suggestion that Dumbledore should be laid to rest at Hogwarts. Sprout attends Dumbledore's funeral, where she appears cleaner than she has ever been seen before.

In Deathly Hallows, she chases Snape away from Hogwarts with Professors McGonagall and Flitwick. Informed that Voldemort and his Death Eaters are coming to besiege Hogwarts, she uses her knowledge of magical plants by improvising offensive botany, and, with the help of several students, throws Mandrakes, Snargaluff pods, and Venomous Tentaculas off the castle walls at the approaching Death Eaters. The epilogue of Deathly Hallows reveals that Neville has become the new Herbology teacher at Hogwarts. The circumstances of Sprout's departure from the job are not revealed.

Sprout was portrayed by Miriam Margolyes in the film adaptation of Chamber of Secrets and Deathly Hallows – Part 2.

Sybill Trelawney

Sybill Patricia Trelawney is the Divination teacher. She is the great-great-granddaughter of the celebrated Seer, Cassandra Trelawney, and has inherited some of her ancestor's talent. Trelawney is described as a slight woman resembling an insect, draped in a large spangled shawl and many gaudy bangles and rings. She speaks in a whispy voice and wears thick glasses, which cause her eyes to appear greatly magnified. Her odd classroom in the North Tower of Hogwarts is a cross between "someone's attic and an old-fashioned tea shop"; it can only be reached by climbing to the top of the stairs and then up a ladder through a trapdoor set in the ceiling. This dim, heavily scented, and "stiflingly" warm room often affects students' wakefulness.

Trelawney first appears in the third book of the series, when Harry, Ron, and Hermione start Divination lessons. The friends generally believe Trelawney is a fraud. Parvati Patil and Lavender Brown are very fond of and impressed by her. According to Professor McGonagall, her credibility as a Seer is undermined by her habit of erroneously predicting, each year, the death of one of her students, she uses it as a greeting for her class. Her more profound predictions seem only to happen when she is in a trance and unaware of what she is saying, with no memory of it afterward. Almost all her predictions were later shown to be true in the books even if she was not in a trance.

Before the events of the Harry Potter books, Trelawney falls into a prophetic trance during an interview with Dumbledore at the Hog's Head, making a prophecy about the birth of a wizard "with the power to vanquish" the dark lord, Voldemort. This prophecy is partly overheard by Snape, who relays what he heard to Voldemort. This leads Voldemort to attack the Potter family, believing that Harry was the child named.

In Harry Potter and the Prisoner of Azkaban, Trelawney erroneously predicts that Harry was born around Midwinter, even though he was born on 31 July, with it later being revealed that this slip-up was because Trelawney was unknowingly reading the piece of Voldemort's soul within Harry. She also accurately prophesies to Harry about the events of the book's climax, including Peter Pettigrew's return to Voldemort's side.

In Order of the Phoenix, Trelawney is first put on probation by Umbridge, and later fired. Dumbledore intervenes to allow Trelawney to stay in the castle, as he believes that she would be in danger outside Hogwarts due to the prophecy she made during her interview, and recruits Firenze from the centaur herd in the Forbidden Forest to replace her as a way of spiting Umbridge. Dumbledore later reveals that the prophecy is why he keeps her employed as a Divination teacher. After Umbridge is ousted, Trelawney returns to teaching in Half-Blood Prince, but has to share classes with Firenze, as he was cast out by his fellow centaurs when he agreed to replace Trelawney after she was fired, which she thinks is an outrage. In Harry Potter and the Deathly Hallows, she is seen aiding in the Battle of Hogwarts by magically accelerating her crystal balls at Death Eaters. She uses one of these crystal balls to defend an injured Lavender against an attack by Fenrir Greyback. In the film adaptation, Harry Potter and the Deathly Hallows – Part 2, she is seen covering someone's body, with the aid of Padma Patil.

In the British editions of the books, her name is consistently spelled as "Sybill". In the American editions, from her first appearance in Prisoner of Azkaban through Order of the Phoenix, her name is spelled as "Sibyll". However, in the American edition of Half-Blood Prince, it is re-spelled as "Sybill", matching the UK edition. The name "Sybill" is a reference to Greek and Roman prophet priestesses, while Cassandra refers to the Trojan seer Cassandra, whose doom was that her prophecies would never be believed.

Professor Trelawney is portrayed by Emma Thompson in the Prisoner of Azkaban, Order of the Phoenix, and Deathly Hallows Part 2.

Hogwarts ghosts
Hogwarts houses have at least twenty ghosts, but when people in the novels speak of the ghosts at Hogwarts they usually refer to one of the four resident ghosts of the Hogwarts houses: Sir Nicholas de Mimsy-Porpington (or, as the students refer to him, Nearly Headless Nick), the almost beheaded ghost of Gryffindor house; the Bloody Baron, who is the ghost of Slytherin house; the jovial Fat Friar, who is the ghost of Hufflepuff house; and the Grey Lady, who in life was Helena Ravenclaw, the ghost of Ravenclaw house. These ghosts seem to act as something like advisers and aides to the students; Nick frequently helps Harry during moments of uncertainty or crisis.

Despite animosity between the houses, their respective ghosts get along well with each other. Nearly Headless Nick is respectful of the Bloody Baron and claims that he cannot imagine starting a fight with him, while the Fat Friar pleads on behalf of Peeves the Poltergeist to allow him to come to the welcome feasts despite his past wrongdoings.  During The Deathly Hallows, Nick is protective of Helena and only reluctantly tells Harry how to find her.

The Bloody Baron
The Bloody Baron is the Slytherin House ghost. He is the only person besides Dumbledore and Fred and George Weasley who can exert any control over the poltergeist Peeves; Peeves is terrified of him for some unknown reason, referring to him as "Your Bloodiness" and "Mr Baron".

The Baron's nickname comes from the fact that he is covered with blood, which appears silvery on his ghostly form. When Nearly Headless Nick is asked in the first book why the Baron is so bloody, Nick delicately comments that "he has never asked". In Harry Potter and the Deathly Hallows, Helena Ravenclaw (the Grey Lady) explains to Harry that the Baron had been in love with her when the two were alive, and when she ran off with her mother's diadem, Rowena Ravenclaw sent the Baron after her, knowing he would not stop until Helena was found. When Helena refused to return with him, the Baron killed her in a fit of rage, and then, in remorse, killed himself with the same weapon. He has thus haunted Hogwarts ever since, wearing his ghostly chains as a form of penance.

Terence Bayler portrayed the Baron in the first film. In contrast to his book counterpart, the Baron is mirthful in the film, playfully swiping through the Sorting feast with his sword, much to the amusement of those within his house.

The Fat Friar
The Fat Friar is the Hufflepuff House ghost. He is a jolly man and very forgiving, frequently suggesting that Peeves be given another chance, or forgiven for any mishaps.

Simon Fisher-Becker appeared as the Fat Friar in the film adaptation of Philosopher's Stone.

The Grey Lady
The Grey Lady is the Ravenclaw House ghost. According to a letter written by Rowling to Nina Young, the actress who played the Grey Lady in the first film, she is "a highly intellectual young lady .... She never found true love as she never found a man up to her standards".

Harry Potter and the Deathly Hallows reveals that the Grey Lady is Helena Ravenclaw, daughter of Rowena Ravenclaw, making her the only house ghost known to be related to one of the Hogwarts founders. She informs Harry that she stole the Diadem of Ravenclaw from her mother, in an attempt to become smarter than her, and then went into hiding in Albania. It was a dying Rowena Ravenclaw's wish to see her daughter again, and so she sent for the Bloody Baron to look for her, knowing that he would not rest until he brought her back, partly because he was in unrequited love with her. However, she refused to come with the Baron and, in a moment of blind rage, he killed her with a single stab-wound to the chest. Overcome with remorse, the Bloody Baron killed himself using the same weapon in turn and wears chains as penitence, "as he should", the Grey Lady says. The diadem remained in the hollow of a tree in an Albanian forest until Tom Riddle managed to charm the story out of the Grey Lady. Riddle, who had been seeking historically significant objects to make into Horcruxes, later retrieved the diadem from Albania and hid it in the Room of Requirement at Hogwarts while visiting the castle years later.

In Harry Potter and the Philosopher's Stone, Nina Young played the Grey Lady, and in Harry Potter and the Deathly Hallows – Part 2, she was played by Kelly Macdonald.

Nearly Headless Nick
Sir Nicholas de Mimsy-Porpington KG, often referred to as Nearly Headless Nick, Nick, or Sir Nicholas, is the Gryffindor House ghost who in life was sentenced to death by beheading after a teeth-straightening spell went awry on Lady Grieve. However, the executioner's axe was blunt and Nick's head was still attached to his neck by a thin strip of skin after 45 chops. Harry becomes friends with Nick when he attends his "deathday" party (the 500th anniversary of the event) in a Hogwarts dungeon. Nick's death date (31 October 1492) had the distinction of having served as the basis for the entire chronology of the Harry Potter stories, until the timeline was confirmed by James and Lily's headstone in Harry Potter and the Deathly Hallows. His greatest wish is to become a member of the Headless Hunt, as mentioned in the second book. However, he is excluded due to the fact that he is not actually headless ("he is nearly headless") and would never be completely able to participate in the activities (such as "Head Polo").

In Chamber of Secrets, Nick is a victim of the Basilisk that Ginny Weasley unleashes under the influence of Tom Riddle. The stare of the Basilisk is lethal to anyone who looks it directly in the eye. All of its living victims meet its gaze indirectly, either from a reflection or by seeing it through something else, and are only petrified rather than killed. Nick is the only one to look directly at the Basilisk, but he too is petrified since he is a ghost and cannot die again. Nick also protected Hufflepuff student Justin Finch-Fletchley from death after Justin saw the basilisk's eyes through Nick's transparent body, thus only petrifying him as well.

The character appears again in Harry Potter and the Order of the Phoenix when Harry has been looking for comfort upon Sirius' death, hoping he can see him later as a ghost. Nick explains that only witches and wizards who fear death and refuse to go on can become ghosts, dashing Harry's hope of communicating with Sirius. He appears briefly in Harry Potter and the Deathly Hallows, when Harry asks Nick to bring him to the Grey Lady.

The character also appears in the 2023 video game Hogwarts Legacy as a non-playable character.

The character was portrayed in the film series by John Cleese, though he only appears in the first two films.

Hogwarts founders
Hogwarts was founded a millennium ago (the exact date unknown) by "four of the greatest witches and wizards of the age": Godric Gryffindor, Helga Hufflepuff, Rowena Ravenclaw, and Salazar Slytherin. The founders served as Hogwarts' first teachers, and each of the Hogwarts houses is named after one of the founders.

Godric Gryffindor
Godric Gryffindor was one of the four founders of Hogwarts School of Witchcraft and Wizardry. He was good friends with Salazar Slytherin but they had conflicting ideas as Salazar believed no muggle-borns should be accepted into Hogwarts. "Godric Gryffindor was the most accomplished dueller of his time and an enlightened fighter against Muggle-discrimination".

His known relics are a goblin-made sword adorned with rubies also known as "The Sword of Gryffindor" and the Sorting Hat. The two items share a particular bond: whenever a Gryffindor student is in a time of need, the sword will present itself within the Sorting Hat. In his second year, Harry Potter pulled the sword out of the hat when he was in need of a weapon in the Chamber of Secrets. Gryffindor is said to have praised courage, determination and strength of heart above all other qualities. He also was the most accepting of allowing Muggle-borns into the school.

Helga Hufflepuff
Helga Hufflepuff came from a broad valley. The Sorting Hat describes her as "good Hufflepuff" or "sweet Hufflepuff". She favoured loyalty, honesty, and dedication. In Goblet of Fire, she is said to have considered "hard workers almost always most worthy of admission". Elsewhere, she is described as taking "all the rest" of the students after selection by her colleagues. She was a good friend of Rowena Ravenclaw; their friendship is used to emphasise the failed friendship between Godric Gryffindor and Salazar Slytherin.

"One of the four celebrated Founders of Hogwarts, Hufflepuff was particularly famous for her dexterity at food-related Charms. Many recipes traditionally served at Hogwarts feasts originated with Hufflepuff." Her wizard card, penned by Rowling, describes her as having "brought people from different walks of life together to help build Hogwarts", and being "loved for her charming ways". According to an interview between Rowling and staff from The Leaky Cauldron, Hufflepuff introduced house-elves to Hogwarts, where she offered them refuge. Both the famous wizard card and the illustration on Rowling's website depict her as a plump woman with red hair.

One relic of Hufflepuff, a small golden cup emblazoned with her symbol of a badger, is passed down to her distant descendant, Hepzibah Smith. This cup is stolen by Riddle and made into a Horcrux. The Hufflepuff Cup was destroyed by Hermione who stabbed it with a basilisk fang in Deathly Hallows.

Rowena Ravenclaw
 Rowena Ravenclaw was a witch noted for her cleverness and creativity, and was described by Xenophilius Lovegood as beautiful. The Sorting Hat introduces her as "Fair Ravenclaw, from glen", suggesting she was from Scotland. Ravenclaw devised the ever-changing floor plans and moving staircases in the Hogwarts castle, and coined the proverb "Wit beyond measure is man's greatest treasure." Ravenclaw is described by the Sorting Hat as having selected students according to intelligence and wisdom. "Rowena Ravenclaw was the most brilliant witch of her time, though legend has it that a broken heart (cause: her daughter Helena left her with the diadem) contributed to her early demise." It is revealed in the Deathly Hallows that the broken heart contributing to her untimely death was most likely the loss of her daughter, Helena Ravenclaw, who is, in fact, the Ravenclaw House Ghost (nicknamed The Grey Lady), and the lost diadem, the very relic to which Ravenclaw's astounding wisdom was attributed.

In Harry Potter and the Deathly Hallows, Harry learns that an artefact of Ravenclaw's became a Horcrux: her lost diadem, which granted enhanced wisdom to its wearer. The Ravenclaw Diadem is destroyed near the end of the book as a result of exposure to Fiendfyre summoned by Vincent Crabbe, who is killed in the process while trying to control the fire.

Salazar Slytherin
Salazar Slytherin is described as power-hungry by the Sorting Hat, and was known as "shrewd Slytherin from fen". Salazar Slytherin was one of the first recorded Parselmouths, an accomplished Legilimens, and a notorious champion of pureblood supremacy. The pureblood supremacy angle may have been exaggerated over a thousand years. Slytherin is the only founder whose physical appearance is described in any detail; his statue in the Chamber of Secrets depicts a man "ancient and monkey-like, with a long thin beard that fell almost to the bottom of his sweeping robes." According to Dumbledore, the qualities that Slytherin prized in his handpicked students included his own rare ability to speak Parseltongue, resourcefulness, and determination. He also selected his students according to cunning, ambition, and blood purity. Slytherin's first name is a reference to the mid-20th-century Portuguese dictator's surname – Rowling's 1990–1993 stay in Portugal (where memory and legacy are present long after the dictatorship era) inspired this name choice.

Slytherin's background is first discussed by Professor Binns in Harry Potter and the Chamber of Secrets (and by Professor McGonagall in the film version and Professor Flitwick in the computer game). He describes the founding of the school and the schism which developed between Slytherin and the other founders, and he mentions that the castle was founded far from Muggles because, at that time, common people feared magic and persecuted suspected wizards and witches. Slytherin wanted magical learning restricted to all-magical families, as he believed Muggle-born students to be untrustworthy and he disliked teaching such students. According to ancient legend, Slytherin was responsible for the construction of the Chamber of Secrets, a chamber with contents including a Basilisk, a giant serpent that can kill by looking people directly in the eyes, susceptible to control by the Heir of Slytherin, and left there to purge the school of all Muggle-born students. Another hypothesis suggests the Basilisk was meant to fend off an invading muggle force. This occurred shortly before infighting among the four founders broke out and resulted in Slytherin's departure.

Salazar Slytherin's locket, passed down to his family, was turned into a Horcrux by his descendant Voldemort and destroyed by Ron Weasley using the Sword of Gryffindor in Deathly Hallows.

In June 2016, J. K. Rowling revealed on Pottermore that Slytherin's wand contained a fragment of basilisk horn, and was taught by its creator to "sleep" when instructed, which meant that it could place others who possessed the wand in a sleep from which they could only be awakened by the cries of the person's children. This secret was handed down through the centuries to each member of Slytherin's family who possessed it. By the 1600s it belonged to the Irish witch Gormlaith Gaunt, though in about 1620 it was stolen by her then-17-year-old niece Isolt Sayre, who fled to where Massachusetts, United States is today. There, she founded the Ilvermorny School of Witchcraft and Wizardry. She buried the wand outside the school grounds, and within a year, an unknown species of snakewood tree grew from the burial spot. It resisted all attempts to prune or kill it, but after several years the leaves were found to contain powerful medicinal properties.

See also
 List of Harry Potter characters

References

External links

 The Harry Potter Lexicon's page on the Hogwarts Staff
 Hogwarts Project – Hogwarts Teachers

Harry Potter characters
Fictional school personnel
Fictional schoolteachers
Literary characters introduced in 1997